Khorramabad Rural District is a rural district (dehestan) in Esfarvarin District, Takestan County, Qazvin Province, Iran. At the 2006 census, its population was 6,459, in 1,545 families.  The rural district has 5 villages.

References 

Rural Districts of Qazvin Province
Takestan County